Vladimir Makeev (born 11 September 1957) is a former Soviet alpine skier who competed in the 1980 Winter Olympics and 1984 Winter Olympics.

External links
 sports-reference.com
 

1957 births
Living people
Soviet male alpine skiers
Olympic alpine skiers of the Soviet Union
Alpine skiers at the 1980 Winter Olympics
Alpine skiers at the 1984 Winter Olympics
Place of birth missing (living people)